Mark Baltin is an American linguist and member of the faculty of New York University. Originally from the Mount Airy section of Philadelphia, he attended Central High School. He received his BA in Linguistics in 1971 at McGill University, his MA in 1975 at the University of Pennsylvania and his PhD in Linguistics in 1978 at the Massachusetts Institute of Technology.

Baltin has written on many topics in generative grammar, including movement, antecedent-contained deletion, ellipsis, lexical representation and phrase structure. His 1982 paper "A Landing Site Theory of Movement Rules" was influential in restricting the kinds of rules that are to be admitted in grammars.

References
 Baltin, Mark. 1982. A Landing Site Theory of Movement Rules. Linguistic Inquiry 13 no. 1. 
 Baltin, Mark. 1984. Language Learnability, Language Variation, and Some Recent Proposals in Grammatical Theory. Annals of the New York Academy of Sciences 433 no. 1, 201-212.
 Baltin, Mark. 1987. Do Antecedent-Contained Deletions Exist? Linguistic Inquiry 18 no. 4, 579-595.
 Baltin, Mark. 1995. Floating Quantifiers, PRO, and Predication. Linguistic Inquiry 26 no. 2.
 Baltin, Mark. 2003. The interaction of ellipsis and binding: implications for the sequencing of Principle A. Natural Language and Linguistic Theory 21, 215-246.
 Baltin, Mark. 2006. The Nonunity of VP-Preposing. Language 82 no. 4, 734-766.
Baltin, Mark.2012. Deletion Versus Pro-Forms: An Overly Simplistic Dichotomy. "Natural Language and Linguistic Theory" 30 381-423.

External links
 Mark Baltin homepage (NYU)
 NYU Linguistics Homepage

Living people
Linguists from the United States
Syntacticians
New York University faculty
Educators from Philadelphia
McGill University alumni
University of Pennsylvania School of Arts and Sciences alumni
MIT School of Humanities, Arts, and Social Sciences alumni
Central High School (Philadelphia) alumni
Year of birth missing (living people)